The 1999 Australian Sports Sedan Championship was a CAMS sanctioned Australian motor racing title open to Sports Sedans complying with CAMS Group 2D regulations. The championship, which was the fifteenth Australian Sports Sedan Championship, was won by Tony Ricciardello driving an Alfa Romeo Alfetta GTV – Chevrolet.

Calendar
The championship was contested over a five round series.

Championship results

References

National Sports Sedan Series
Sports Sedan Championship